The Vought XF3U was the prototype of a two-seat, all-metal biplane fighter, built by Vought Aircraft Company of Dallas, Texas for the United States Navy.

Development and design
The XF3U was designed to meet the Bureau of Aeronautics 1932 Design Specification No. 111, which called for a high-performance fighter with a fixed undercarriage and powered by a Pratt & Whitney R-1535 Twin Wasp Junior air-cooled radial engine. Of the seven proposed aircraft the XF3U and the Douglas XFD were chosen. The XF3U was the first all-metal aircraft produced by Vought. The aircraft was also equipped with an enclosed cockpit. During flight testing in 1933, it outperformed the Douglas entry and was chosen the winner.

Operational history
The Navy no longer was interested in two-seat fighters, and therefore only the one XF3U prototype aircraft was built. The XF3U subsequently evolved into a dive bomber, and became the XSBU prototype for the SBU-1 Corsair.

Specifications

References

Notes

Bibliography

 Angelucci,Enzo. The American Fighter from 1917 to the present. New York: Orion Books, 1987. .

External links

F03U
1930s United States fighter aircraft
Single-engined tractor aircraft
Biplanes
Aircraft first flown in 1933